Shayne Angelo Toporowski (born August 6, 1975) is a Canadian former professional ice hockey right winger and current college coach. He was drafted into the National Hockey League (NHL) in the second round, 42nd overall, by the Los Angeles Kings in the 1993 draft. He played 3 games in the NHL with the Toronto Maple Leafs during the 1996–97 season, with the rest of his career spent in Europe.

Playing career
Toporowski was born in Paddockwood, Saskatchewan. After being drafted, Toporowski continued to play junior hockey for the Prince Albert Raiders of the Western Hockey League (WHL). In October 1994, the Kings traded him, Guy Leveque, Dixon Ward, and Kelly Fairchild to the Toronto Maple Leafs in exchange for Eric Lacroix, Chris Snell, and a fourth-round pick in the 1996 draft. The following two seasons, Toporowski played for the Maple Leafs' minor league affiliate, the St. John's Maple Leafs of the American Hockey League (AHL). In the 1996–97 season, Toronto called him up for three NHL games.

The following off-season, he signed a two-year contract with the St. Louis Blues and played for their AHL affiliate, the Worcester IceCats. The year following, he signed a one-year contract with the Phoenix Coyotes and played for their AHL affiliate, the Springfield Falcons.

From 2000 to 2012, he played in various European leagues. He then played his last season of professional hockey with the Quad City Mallards of the Central Hockey League (CHL).

Post-playing career
After retiring, Toporowski served as an assistant coach of the Division I Holy Cross Crusaders in the Atlantic Hockey Association for the 2013–14 season. As of 2014, he currently serves as head coach of the Division III Worcester State Lancers of the Massachusetts State Collegiate Athletic Conference.

Career statistics

Regular season and playoffs

References

External links
 

1975 births
Living people
Belfast Giants players
Canadian ice hockey right wingers
EC VSV players
ERC Ingolstadt players
Espoo Blues players
Amur Khabarovsk players
Ice hockey people from Saskatchewan
Ice Hockey Superleague players
Ilves players
Los Angeles Kings draft picks
Lukko players
Luleå HF players
Lahti Pelicans players
Prince Albert Raiders players
Quad City Mallards (CHL) players
St. John's Maple Leafs players
SaiPa players
Springfield Falcons players
Toronto Maple Leafs players
Worcester IceCats players
Tappara players
Canadian expatriate ice hockey players in the United States
Canadian expatriate ice hockey players in Northern Ireland
Canadian expatriate ice hockey players in Finland
Canadian expatriate ice hockey players in Germany
Canadian expatriate ice hockey players in Russia
Canadian expatriate ice hockey players in Sweden
Canadian expatriate ice hockey players in Austria